Great Florida Birding and Wildlife Trail (GFBWT) is a 2,000 mile (3200 km) long collection of more than 500 locations in the U.S. state of Florida where the state's bird habitats are protected. The trail promotes birdwatching, environmental education and ecotourism. The GFBWT is a program of the Florida Fish and Wildlife Conservation Commission, supported in part by the Florida Department of Transportation and the Wildlife Foundation of Florida. It is modeled after the successful Great Texas Coastal Birding Trail. Trail sites area identifiable by prominent road signs bearing the Swallow-tailed kite logo.

The trail is divided into four sections (Panhandle, West, Eastern, and South) each containing at least two 'gateway' sites. Within each section the sites are grouped into clusters. Usually the sites in a cluster are within an hour's drive of each other.

Many of the state's 514 species can be found along the trail, including the roseate spoonbill, limpkin, swallow-tailed kite, red-cockaded woodpecker, smooth-billed ani and the endangered Florida scrub jay.

Panhandle
82 sites in 16 counties
 Big Lagoon State Park - Escambia County
 St. Marks National Wildlife Refuge - Lighthouse Unit - Wakulla County
 St. Vincent National Wildlife Refuge - Franklin & Gulf Counties
 St. George Island State Park - Franklin County

West
119 sites in 21 counties
 Paynes Prairie Preserve State Park - Alachua County
 Fort De Soto Park - Pinellas County
 Weekiwachee Preserve - Hernando County
 Crystal River Archaeological State Park - Citrus County
 Caladesi Island State Park - Pinellas County
 Lower Suwannee National Wildlife Refuge - Dixie & Levy Counties

Eastern
182 sites in 18 counties
 Fort Clinch State Park - Nassau County
 Merritt Island National Wildlife Refuge - Brevard County
 Tenoroc Fish Management Area - Polk County
 Turkey Creek Sanctuary - Brevard County
 Bok Tower Gardens - Polk County

South

122 sites in 12 counties
 Corkscrew Swamp Sanctuary - Collier County
 Conservancy of Southwest Florida Nature Center, Collier County
 Arthur R. Marshall Loxahatchee National Wildlife Refuge - Palm Beach County
 Bahia Honda State Park - Big Pine Key - Monroe County
 Big Cypress National Preserve - Collier County
 Everglades National Park - Collier, Miami-Dade, & Monroe Counties

See also
 State wildlife trails (United States)

References

External links
 Official website
 Q&A With: Julie Brashears, Great Florida Birding and Wildlife Trail Coordinator at EcoFlorida

National Wildlife Refuges in Florida
Wilderness areas of Florida
Birdwatching sites in the United States